This is a list of mosques in Qatar. As of 28 May 2017, there were a total of 2,000 mosques recorded in the country.

See also
 Islam in Qatar
 Lists of mosques

References

External links

 
Qatar
Mosques